Iris Slappendel (born 18 February 1985) is a Dutch former road racing cyclist.

Career
She won the 2012 Open de Suède Vårgårda road race, the penultimate event in the 2012 UCI Women's Road World Cup. Slappendel took a total of five UCI race victories in her career, including the GP Comune di Cornaredo and stages of the Thüringen Rundfahrt der Frauen, the Ster Zeeuwsche Eilanden and La Route de France.

In September 2016 she announced her retirement from professional competition, having won her final race, the Gateway Cup, earlier that month.

Personal life
Outside of cycling, she works freelance as a designer, and she won a competition to design new jerseys for the leaders of the season-long classifications of the UCI Women's Road World Cup, to be used from the 2014 season. Since retiring, Slappendel has continued her career as a designer and started her own business that designs and manufactures cycling apparel. Having previously represented female riders in the UCI Athlete's Commission from 2015 to 2017, Slappendel now dedicates her time to The Cyclists' Alliance as executive director.

Major results

2006
 3rd Overall Ster Zeeuwsche Eilanden
2007
 8th Road race, National Road Championships
2008
 5th Time trial, National Road Championships
 9th Overall Ster Zeeuwsche Eilanden
 10th Peperbus Profspektakel
2009
 2nd Omloop Van De Blauwe Stad
 3rd Open de Suède Vårgårda TTT
 3rd Grand Prix Elsy Jacobs
 4th Chrono Champenois - Trophée Européen
 8th Time trial, National Road Championships
 9th Overall Holland Ladies Tour
 9th Omloop van Borsele
2010
 1st Open de Suède Vårgårda TTT
 2nd Overall Ster Zeeuwsche Eilanden
 3rd Parkhotel Rooding Hills Classic
 5th Time trial, National Road Championships
 6th Omloop Door Middag-humsterland
 8th Overall Thüringen Rundfahrt der Frauen
1st Stage 6
 10th Omloop Het Nieuwsblad
 10th Ronde van Drenthe
2011
 3rd Overall Ladies Tour of Qatar
 3rd Open de Suède Vårgårda TTT
 4th Time trial, National Road Championships
 5th Erondegemse Pijl
 6th Overall Ster Zeeuwsche Eilanden
 7th Overall Trophée d'Or Féminin
 7th Open de Suède Vårgårda
 8th 7-Dorpenomloop Aalburg
 9th Omloop van Borsele
2012
 1st GP Comune di Cornaredo
 1st Open de Suède Vårgårda
 National Road Championships
3rd Time trial
10th Road race
 3rd Open de Suède Vårgårda TTT
 4th Team time trial, UCI Road World Championships
 4th Overall Ster Zeeuwsche Eilanden
1st Prologue
 6th Overall Energiewacht Tour
 6th Erondegemse Pijl
 6th 7-Dorpenomloop Aalburg
2013
 2nd Grand Prix de Dottignies
 3rd Gooik–Geraardsbergen–Gooik
 8th Time trial, National Road Championships
 8th Overall Trophée d'Or Féminin
 8th Overall Energiewacht Tour
2014
 1st Overall Sprints classification UCI Women's Road World Cup
 1st  Road race, National Road Championships
 1st Stage 7 La Route de France
 8th Ronde van Overijssel
 10th Overall Ladies Tour of Qatar
 10th Ronde van Drenthe World Cup
2015
 8th Gent–Wevelgem
2016
 1st Gateway Cup

References

External links

Iris Slappendel profile at Cycling Quotient

1985 births
Living people
Dutch female cyclists
Sportspeople from Gouda, South Holland
UCI Road World Championships cyclists for the Netherlands
Cyclists from South Holland
21st-century Dutch women